Bucha is a village and a former municipality in the Burgenlandkreis district, in Saxony-Anhalt, Germany. Since 1 July 2009, it is part of the municipality Kaiserpfalz.

Former municipalities in Saxony-Anhalt
Burgenlandkreis